Gama is a municipality and town of Colombia in the Guavio Province, part of the department of Cundinamarca.

Etymology 
Gama is derived either from Muysccubun meaning "our back", or from the language of the local Chío tribe; "behind the licked hill", referring to the lake of Guatavita behind the mountains to the northwest.

History 
Before the Spanish conquest of the Muisca, Gama was inhabited by a tribe called the Chío. The first registration of the village was made in 1846, when the church in Ubalá was constructed. Gama was properly founded not earlier than 1903, by Juan Martín Romero.

Economy 
Main economical activity in Gama is agriculture, with predominantly potatoes, beans, peas and maize cultivated. Other products include yuca, bananas, pineapples and coffee.

References 

Municipalities of Cundinamarca Department
Populated places established in 1903
1903 establishments in Colombia